Arran was launched at Calcutta in 1799. In 1800 she sailed to Britain for the British East India Company (EIC). On her return voyage she suffered a major outbreak of illness while between England and the Cape. She then traded between England and India and around India until she was lost in June 1809 while sailing to Basra from Bengal.

Career
Arran was a "country ship" that performed one voyage for the EIC, sailing from Bengal to London.

Captain John Barker sailed from Calcutta on 28 January 1800, bound for London. Arran was at Kedgeree on 11 March. She reached St Helena on 19 June, and arrived at Deptford on 17 September. There was a disturbance aboard Arran on 27 July among the lascars, but as of December 2022, details are only accessible via archival research.

Arran had a crew of 12 Europeans and 40 lascars and lost only three men on the way to England. The voyage back to Bengal was, however, marked by a much higher mortality rate. She left Portsmouth on 7 December 1800, having taken on 49 native passengers. The first death occurred on 17 December. By the time she reached the Cape, 35 had died and 24 were sick, six of whom died at the hospital there. She sailed from the Cape on 15 March 1781, and arrived at Bengal on 25 May. She had no further deaths after leaving the Cape, and the men who had been sick but had survived all recovered.

 and  also left England at the same time as Arran, and also suffered great mortality among their lascars on the voyage to India.

Arran appears in Lloyd's Register in 1800 with J. Barker, master, Foreman, owner, and trade London–India. The cost of outfitting Arran in London on 25 October 1800 was £2442 3d.

On 9 March 1801 Arran was at the Cape of Good Hope, about to sail for Calcutta.

The costs of outfitting on 15 July 1802 were £2895 9s. Arran was admitted to the Registry of Great Britain on 2 July 1802.

Arran continued to trade with India. On 23 April 1805 Arran, William Robb, master, anchored off Calcutta. She had left Madras on the 15th.

Arran appears in the Register of Shipping for 1809 with Wilson, master, Scott & Co., owner, and trade London–India.

Fate
Arran was wrecked in June 1809 on the island of Karak in the Persian Gulf. By one report she was on a voyage from Bengal to Bussorah, Ottoman Iraq. The cargo was expected to be saved.

By another report, she had sailed from Bussorah and was on her way done the gulf when she stranded on Karak. Captain Wilson paid well for local assistance in removing her cargo and stores. Her cargo consisted of horses, copper, drugs, and a large amount of treasure. All the treasure had been saved and at the time of the report it was expected that the rest of the cargo would be also. Arran had sailed in company with the EIC's  , which remained with her after Arran grounded to protect her cargo and the ship's company.

Notes

Citations

References
 
 
 
 
 
 

1799 ships
British ships built in India
Ships of the British East India Company
Age of Sail merchant ships of England
Maritime incidents in 1809
Shipwrecks in the Persian Gulf